Gymnothorax nuttingi, or Nutting's moray, is a moray eel found in the eastern central Pacific Ocean around Hawaii.

References

nuttingi
Endemic fauna of Hawaii
Fish of Hawaii
Fish described in 1904